Sâncrai may refer to several places in Romania:

 Sâncrai, a village now part of Câmpia Turzii
 Sâncrai, a district in the town of Călan, Hunedoara County
 Sâncrai, a district in the city of Aiud, Alba County
 Sâncrai, a village in Ilieni Commune, Covasna County
 Sâncrai, a village in Dealu Commune, Harghita County

See also
Sâncraiu (disambiguation)